KPTE (92.9 FM, "92.9 The Point") is a radio station that is licensed to Durango, Colorado and serves the Four Corners area. The station is owned by American General Media under the name of licensee Winton Road Broadcasting, LLC and broadcasts an adult contemporary music format.

The station took on the former branding of its sister station KKDG, which used to be called "The Point". KPTE and its sister station KRWN swapped frequencies in May 2014, coinciding with the launch of the new branding, with KRWN moving to 92.5 FM and KPTE moving to 92.9 FM.

Programming includes The Breakfast Club (a local production not to be confused with the nationally syndicated program of the same name) hosted by Deakon and Jessi Kay weekday mornings; Wine About It Wednesday; Eggs over Irie a reggae music show; Back in the Day with Jessi Kay, featuring 1990s hip hop; and "Happy Hour Report" and more!

References

External links

PTE
La Plata County, Colorado
Radio stations established in 1978